The name Rosita has been used for three tropical cyclones worldwide, one in the Western Pacific ocean and two in the Australian Region.

in Western Pacific:
 Typhoon Yutu (2018) (T1826, 31W, Rosita) - a category 5 super typhoon which devastated the Mariana Islands and the Philippines.
Rosita was retired from the PAGASA naming lists following the 2018 typhoon season and replaced with Rosal.

Australian region:
Cyclone Rosita (1990) – stayed out at sea.
Cyclone Rosita (2000)– a tropical cyclone that affected northern Australia from 15 April through 21 April 2000.

Pacific typhoon set index articles
Australian region cyclone set index articles